Peter Bertocci (1910–1989) was an American philosopher and Borden Parker Bowne professor of philosophy, emeritus, at Boston University. He was a president of the Metaphysical Society of America.

Bertocci was an advocate of theistic finitism, proposing that "God is all-good but not all-powerful".

Selected publications

The Empirical Argument for God in Late British Thought (1935)
Introduction to the Philosophy of Religion (1951)
Can the Goodness of God Be Empirically Grounded? (1957)
Sex, Love, and the Person (1967)
The Person God Is (1970)
Is God for Real (1971)
The Goodness of God (1981)

References

20th-century American philosophers
Philosophy academics
1910 births
1989 deaths
Presidents of the Metaphysical Society of America
Place of birth missing
Place of death missing
Boston University faculty